Renato Barbosa dos Santos Júnior (born 5 June 2002), better known as just Renato Júnior, is a Brazilian professional footballer who plays as a striker for Danish Superliga side Viborg FF.

Professional career
Renato Júnior began his career with the Brazilian side, before joining the Primeira Liga side Portimonense on 18 June 2021 for the 2021-22 season. He made his professional debut with Portimonense in a 2-1 Taça da Liga loss to Académica on 23 July 2021.

On transfer deadline day, 31 January 2023, Júnior joined Danish Superliga side Viborg FF on a deal until June 2026.

References

External links
 

2002 births
Living people
Brazilian footballers
Brazilian expatriate footballers
Association football forwards
Footballers from São Paulo
Esporte Clube Água Santa players
Goiás Esporte Clube players
Portimonense S.C. players
Viborg FF players
Primeira Liga players
Campeonato Brasileiro Série A players
Campeonato de Portugal (league) players
Brazilian expatriate sportspeople in Portugal
Brazilian expatriate sportspeople in Denmark
Expatriate footballers in Portugal
Expatriate footballers in Denmark